Enberg is a surname. Notable people with the surname include:

Alexander Enberg (born 1972), American actor and film producer
Dick Enberg (1935–2017), American sportscaster
Patrik Enberg (born 1994), Swedish ice hockey player
Tom Enberg (born 1970), Finnish footballer

See also
Edberg (disambiguation)